The 2005 World Orienteering Championships, the 22nd World Orienteering Championships, were held in Aichi, Japan, 9 –15 August 2005.

The championships had eight events; sprint for men and women, middle distance for men and women, long distance (formerly called individual or classic distance) for men and women, and relays for men and women.

Medalists

References 

World Orienteering Championships
2005 in Japanese sport
International sports competitions hosted by Japan
August 2005 sports events in Asia
Orienteering in Japan
Sport in Aichi Prefecture